The IndieGo Alley Festival (read: Indie-go Alley Festival) is a non-profit internacional film and music festival that takes places in Asturias since 2012.

History 
The name of the festival comes from the words "indie" and the colour of the night, "índigo". 
In November 2012, Palacio Valdés street  in Avilés, welcomes the first edition of this festival, groundbreaking as a free outdoors urban festival.

Structure 
During just a few hours a selection of experimental cinema, short films and videoclips are projected along live performances.

Jury's Special Mention 
From the very beginning the Official Jury votes for the audiovisual projects (after a previous selection), creating the official program. Those projects with more votes receive the Mención especial del Jurado Oficial (Jury's Special Mention).

Awards 2012 
Best short-film:
 "Luminaris" by Juan Pablo Zaramiella (Argentina)

Awards 2013 
Best first audiovisual project:
 "El cielo del ojo" co-producided byr Cinestesias, Euphoria Borelais, Nisi Masa, Franti & Ms. Balthazar's (Finland, France, Italy, Austria y Spain)

Best short-film:
"Prólogo" Lucas Figueroa (Spain)

Awards 2015 
Best experimental project
 "The secret world of Tim" by Hayley Sheppard (New Zealand)

Best short-film
 "Julia" by  Emiliano Cano Díaz (Spain)

Best videoclip
 "Lilla Vän Jag Vill Bo I En Husvagn" by Goblin Mikkanen (Netherlands)

See also 
Avilés

References

External links 
 - Official website
Avilés Town Hall website

Music festivals in Spain
Avilés
Film festivals in Spain